Louis Guillouet, comte d'Orvilliers (26 March 1710 – 1792) was a French admiral.

Life

Louis Guillouet d'Orvilliers was born on 26 March 1710 in Moulins, Allier.
His parents were Claude Guillouet d'Orvilliers, seigneur d'Orvilliers, and Claude de Vict de Pongibaud (–1759).
His older brother was Gilbert Guillouet d'Orvilliers, ( – 11 May 1764), governor of French Guiana from 1749 to 1763,
D'Orvilliers spent most of his childhood in Cayenne, capital of the French colony French Guiana, where his father was governor. In 1723, aged fifteen, he joined the colony's infantry regiment and quickly rose to the rank of Lieutenant. In 1728, he transferred to the Navy and, by 1756, had become a captain, commanding one of the ships sent to Menorca under the direction of La Galissonière. He later took part in action near Santo Domingo and the Antilles and was rewarded with a promotion to rear admiral in 1764.

Franco-American alliance

In 1777, France began assisting the American colonies in their fight for independence from Great Britain. D'Orvilliers was appointed Vice Admiral (Lieutenant-General of the Navy) and prepared to engage the Royal Navy in the Atlantic. His greatest success came in July 1778 during the First Battle of Ushant, when his fleet managed to fend off an attack from a similarly-sized English fleet led by Admiral Augustus Keppel.

The following year, however, he led an unsuccessful attempt to raid the English ports of Portsmouth and Plymouth. Although the weather and crew sickness played a part, he was censured for not making better use of the forces under his command. As a consequence, he resigned his command.

The death of his wife in 1783 affected d'Orvilliers greatly and he withdrew to the Saint-Magloire seminary in Paris. He later returned to the town of his birth, Moulins, where he died in 1792.

The name "Guillouet" comes from the Breton language, a form of Celtic, and means "Man from the wood".

Descendents
The admiral encouraged his grandson, Hugues Duroy de Chaumareys, to enter Naval service. He did not live to witness the court-martial, disgrace and label of "incompetent and complacent" that was triggered by the sinking of the frigate French frigate Méduse (1810) and loss of circa 150 lives, plus the notoriety of the painting by Théodore Géricault of the shipwreck scene The Raft of the Medusa which hangs in the Louvre.

References

Sources

1710 births
1792 deaths
Military personnel from Moulins, Allier
French Navy admirals
French people of the American Revolution